thecontrollersphere is an EP from indie pop band of Montreal. It was made available for pre-order and instant download from Polyvinyl on March 4, 2011 and was officially released on April 26, 2011. The EP consists of tracks recorded along with the album False Priest.

Track listing
 "Black Lion Massacre" – 5:08
 "Flunkt Sass vs the Root Plume" – 2:38
 "Holiday Call" – 8:18
 "L'age D'or" – 3:32
 "Slave Translator" – 4:13

References

2011 EPs
Of Montreal albums
Polyvinyl Record Co. EPs